The 1956 AFC Asian Cup was the first AFC Asian Cup, held every four years and organised by the Asian Football Confederation (AFC). The final tournament was held in Hong Kong from 1 September to 15 September 1956. It was won by South Korea.

Venues

Qualification

Squads

Results 
All times are Hong Kong Time (UTC+8)

Winners

Goalscorers 

With four goals, Nahum Stelmach is the top scorer in the tournament. In total, 27 goals were scored by 15 different players, with none of them credited as own goal.

4 goals
 Nahum Stelmach
3 goals

 Woo Sang-kwon
 Lê Hữu Đức

2 goals

 
 Yehoshua Glazer
 Choi Chung-min
 Sung Nak-woon
 Trần Văn Tổng

1 goal

 
  
 
 
 
 Kim Ji-sung
 Trải Văn Đào

References 

Jovanovic, Bojan; Panahi, Majeed; Veroeveren, Pieter. "Asian Nations Cup 1956". RSSSF.

 
AFC Asian Cup tournaments
Asian Cup, 1956
Afc Asian Cup, 1956
International association football competitions hosted by Hong Kong
AFC
September 1956 sports events in Asia